Lørenskog Ishockeyklubb (founded in 1963) is a Norwegian ice hockey team based in Lørenskog, Norway. The team competed in GET-ligaen from 2008 to 2018. In May 2018, the club did not receive a new licence, due to long-term economic problems.

Season-by-season results
This is a partial list of the last five seasons completed by Lørenskog. For the full season-by-season history, see List of Lørenskog IK seasons.

Current roster 
As of October 20th, 2017.

Famous players

 Marco Charpentier
 Jason Krog
 Andrew Martin
 Dominic Noël

 Dan LaCouture

 Tommy Jakobsen
 Lars Haugen
 Mats Trygg
 Roy Johansen

References

External links
 Official website 

Ice hockey clubs established in 1963
Ice hockey teams in Norway
Sport in Akershus
Lørenskog
GET-ligaen teams
1963 establishments in Norway